Dom Perno is an American former basketball coach and former associate athletic director at The George Washington University. He was head basketball coach at the University of Connecticut for nine seasons, from 1977 to 1986, compiling a 139–114 record, leading teams to the NCAA Division I men's basketball tournament and the National Invitation Tournament (NIT). He coached former George Washington head coach Karl Hobbs in college and recruited Rutgers Head Coach, Steve Pikiell to UConn. Before becoming head coach at UConn, he was head coach at St. Paul Catholic High School in Bristol, Connecticut, then assistant coach at UConn under Dee Rowe.  He was followed at UConn by Jim Calhoun.  After UConn, he worked in business and as a broadcaster before being hired by GW in 1997.

High school career 
As a player for Wilbur Cross High School in New Haven, CT, Perno led his team to 49 consecutive wins and the New England Intercollegiate Basketball Tournament championship played at the Boston Garden. He was named to All-State in 1958-59 and considered attending Boston College and Fairfield University but committed to the University of Connecticut and Coach Hugh Greer.

College basketball career 
Perno was a Guard for the Huskies from 1960 to 1964 when the university participated in the Yankee Conference, which Connecticut won multiple times. On March 14, 1964, UConn upset Princeton and star forward Bill Bradley, 52–50, in the Sweet 16 at Cameron Indoor Stadium. The victory was sealed when Perno stole the ball from Bradley with 19 seconds to play.

Coaching career 
Following graduation, Perno coached at South Catholic High School, Hartford, Connecticut and then at St. Paul Catholic High School in Bristol Connecticut where in addition to coaching boys basketball he was also the athletic director, dean of boys and baseball coach.  The late Jim Valvano convinced him to interview for the top assistant position at UConn that was becoming available due to Valvano’s new head coaching job at Bucknell University. Perno took over for Valvano as top assistant to Donald ‘Dee’ Rowe, and after five years, took over as the head coach. Perno was instrumental in elevating the Husky program with the inception of the Big East Conference.

Following Perno’s retirement from coaching he served as Vice President for Sales and Marketing at the Dumont Group in Bristol, CT and as a color analyst for the Big East Network. In 1997, he accepted the Associate Athletic Director position for Development at The George Washington University in Washington, DC. He retired in 2011.

Personal life
Perno and his wife, Cindy, reside in Orange, CT and are the parents of Dom, Matt and Holly Perno Smith and grandparents of Isabella, Phoebe, Nate and JD.

Head coaching record

References

External links
 George Washington profile

1941 births
Living people
American men's basketball coaches
American men's basketball players
Basketball coaches from Connecticut
Basketball players from New Haven, Connecticut
College men's basketball head coaches in the United States
George Washington Colonials athletic directors
High school basketball coaches in the United States
Sportspeople from New Haven, Connecticut
UConn Huskies men's basketball coaches
UConn Huskies men's basketball players
Guards (basketball)
Wilbur Cross High School alumni